Banei is a village and gram panchayat in Salarpur block, Budaun district, Uttar Pradesh, India. Its village code is 128241. According to 2011 Census of India, the total population of the village is 4,286, out of 2,233 are males and 2,053 are females.

References

Villages in Budaun district